Cincinnati–Louisville rivalry may refer to:

Cincinnati–Louisville rivalry, a college rivalry between University of Cincinnati and University of Louisville
The Keg of Nails, a traveling trophy awarded to the winner of the Cincinnati Bearcats vs. Louisville Cardinals football game
River Cities Cup, a soccer rivalry between FC Cincinnati and Louisville City FC